The Kylesku Bridge (officially known since 2019 by its Gaelic name Drochaid a' Chaolais Chumhaing) is a distinctively curved concrete box girder bridge in north-west Scotland that crosses the Loch a' Chàirn Bhàin in Sutherland. It is listed as category A, the highest grade.

History
In June 1978 the Highland Regional Council asked Ove Arup & Partners Scotland to prepare a feasibility study for a bridge, in their capacity as consulting civil engineers, and was prepared by March 1979.

Construction for the approach roads, costing £4 million, began in summer 1981. Construction of the bridge began in August 1982, with Morrison Construction and Lehane, Mackenzie and Shand the chief contractors.

The cost of the bridge was £4 million, although was earlier budgeted at £2.75 million. The bridge opened to traffic in July 1984, and was formally opened by the Queen on 8 August 1984.

In 2019, the bridge was classified by Historic Environment Scotland as a Category A structure, recognising it as "visually striking and technically innovative". It was also officially renamed to the Gaelic translation of its name, Drochaid a' Chaolais Chumhaing.

Geography
It replaced the ferry between Kylesku and Kylestrome, which was 400 metres to the east.

Design
The bridge is 275 metres (902 feet) long with a 79 metre long main span.

The bridge deck is supported by V-shaped inclined piers, with eight inclined legs, in order to reduce the length of the main span. The lateral forces from each leg balance, so the total force on the foundations is vertically downwards. The spread of legs supports the bridge in winds which can exceed , and also loads resulting from the curvature of the bridge. There is no joint between the legs and the deck of the bridge, with the expansion joints and bearings being located at the abutments to facilitate straightforward maintenance. The legs are formed from reinforced concrete and the deck from prestressed concrete using cables tensioned at up to 52200 kN.

The bridge is designed to be sympathetic to the surrounding country, and the approaches were chosen to minimise changes to the landscape.

References

External links

 Construction at night

Video clips
 Aerial view in 2012
 View in 2009
 Former ferry in 1966

1984 establishments in Scotland
Box girder bridges
Bridges completed in 1984
Bridges in Highland (council area)
Concrete bridges
Ove Arup buildings and structures
Road bridges in Scotland
Buildings and structures in Sutherland
Category A listed buildings in Highland (council area)